Glossosphecia is a genus of moths in the family Sesiidae.

Species
Glossosphecia contaminata (Butler, 1878)
Glossosphecia romanovi (Leech, 1889a)
Glossosphecia huoshanensis (Xu, 1993)
Glossosphecia melli (Zukowsky, 1929)
Glossosphecia sherpa (Bartsch, 2003)

References

Sesiidae